Sanchong District is a district in the western part of New Taipei City, Taiwan. With an area of 16.32 km2 and a population of 380,699 people (February 2023), it has the fourth highest population density in Taiwan and 23rd highest in the world, with over 23,900 people per km2.

Geography

Sanchong is bounded to the north and northwest by Luzhou, Wugu, the west by Xinzhuang, and is separated from Taipei City by the Tamsui River.

History
Sanchong was called Satengpo, which literally means "The Third Plain" by the early settlers. The settlers from the modern-day Xinzhuang area moved up north and named the plains they settle as "The First Plain" (頭前埔, located in modern-day Xinzhuang District), "The Second Plain" (二重埔, located in modern-day Sanchong) and The Third Plain.

The district has been an important suburb of Taipei. On 1 April 1962, Sanchong was upgraded from an urban township to be a county-administered city. On 25 December 2010 with the creation of New Taipei City from former Taipei County, Sanchong City was upgraded into a district.

Demography
As of October 2015, there were 388,550 people living in the district.

The 2010 Population Census reported that Sanchong has a population of 390,904. The population density was 24,172.6 inhabitants per square kilometer.

Education
 New Taipei Municipal New Taipei Senior High School
 New Taipei Municipal SanChong High School
 New Taipei Municipal San-Chung Commercial and Industrial Vocational High School

Tourist attractions

 New Taipei Bridge
 New Taipei Metropolitan Park
 Xianse Temple (先嗇宮)
 Erchong Riverside Park
 Erchong Lotus Park
 Chongyang Bridge — a cable-stayed bridge and a beautiful night-time landmark

Shopping and eating
Sanhe Nightmarket
Carrefour Chongxin Shopping Mall
B&Q Home Improvements, Hardware
Ikea Home Furnishings Etc.

Transportation

The district is served by the Taipei Metro Zhonghe-Xinlu Line at Sanchong Elementary School Station, Sanhe Junior High School Station, Taipei Bridge Station, Cailiao Station, Sanchong Station, and Xianse Temple Station. The Taoyuan Airport MRT also stops at Sanchong station.

The district is accessible by National Highway No. 1, Provincial Highway No. 1 and No.1A, and Provincial Highway No. 64. The district is connected to Taipei via Chongyang Bridge, Taipei Bridge, Zhongxiao Bridge, and Zhongxing Bridge. It is also connected to Xinzhuang, Luzhou, Wugu, and Banqiao District.

Notable natives
 Brigitte Lin, actress
 Neil Peng, screenwriter and political activist

See also
 New Taipei City

References

External links

  

Districts of New Taipei